Dayton Union Station was a railroad station serving Dayton, Ohio with daily passenger trains of several railroads. The station was located at 251 W. Sixth Street at the intersection of Ludlow Street, and it opened in 1900, replacing an earlier depot built in the mid-1850s. It was owned by the Dayton Union Railroad Co., which was owned by the Cincinnati, Hamilton and Dayton Railway, the Cleveland, Cincinnati, Chicago and St. Louis Railway, and the Pittsburgh, Cincinnati, Chicago and St. Louis Railroad. Through a series of mergers over the years, it was ultimately owned by the New York Central Railroad, Baltimore & Ohio Railroad, and Pennsylvania Railroad.

Colloquially called the "Tower Depot," it included a seven-story clock tower. In the first 30 years of operation, the station hosted as many as 66 passenger trains a day. In 1931 the station opened an elevated platform to alleviate congestion between trains, streetcars and automobiles. 

Famous people who stopped by the station included child actress Shirley Temple in 1944, President Harry S. Truman in 1948 and President Ronald Reagan in 1983, both of the latter two making campaign stops, Reagan making a whistle stop tour.

Named trains

Decline
In summer 1964 part of the station was demolished to make way for an extension of Sixth Street. Amtrak took over passenger service in 1971, and cut back service to a single train, the Spirit of St. Louis, inherited from Penn Central. That train was subsequently extended to Kansas City and renamed the National Limited.

The last train out of the station was the National Limited, which was eliminated in October, 1979 when U.S. Transportation Secretary Brock Adams opted to eliminate half a dozen Amtrak routes he deemed lower performing. The last remnants of the station were removed altogether in 1989.

Notes

External links

Wright State University Libraries' Special Collections and Archives - Dayton’s Union Station: Early Years -Photos of the station in its earliest decades
Wright State University Libraries' Special Collections and Archives - Dayton’s Union Station: 1940s & 1950s -Photos of the station from the mid-20th Century
Wright State University Libraries' Special Collections and Archives - Dayton’s Union Station: Later Years 1960s+ -Photos of the station from the 1960s to the 1980s

Former Baltimore and Ohio Railroad stations
Former New York Central Railroad stations
Former Pennsylvania Railroad stations
Dayton, Ohio
Former railway stations in Ohio
Railway stations in the United States opened in 1900
Railway stations closed in 1979
Demolished railway stations in the United States
Former Amtrak stations in Ohio